Pyrostria revoluta, formerly Scyphochlamys revoluta, is a species of flowering plant in the family Rubiaceae that lives on the island of Rodrigues.

Distribution and conservation
Pyrostria revoluta is found on Rodrigues, one of the Mascarene Islands in the Indian Ocean, and an Outer island of Mauritius. By 1980, it appeared to be restricted to Grande Montagne and Cascade Victoire, and by 1989, the species was considered to be "on the verge of extinction". Some seeds were sent to the Royal Botanic Gardens, Kew, where they were successfully germinated in 1982 and subsequently grown up. Cuttings have since been taken, effectively ensuring the species' survival in cultivation.

Description

The leaves are notably dimorphic – they grow in two distinctly different forms.

Taxonomic history
It followed a scientific expedition to Rodrigues to observe the 1874 transit of Venus, on which Balfour, along with George Gulliver and Henry Horrocks Slater, served as naturalist.

References

External links
 World Checklist of Rubiaceae

Vanguerieae
Endemic flora of Rodrigues
Plants described in 1877
Taxa named by Isaac Bayley Balfour
Taxa named by Birgitta Bremer